Robaje is a village situated in Mionica municipality in Serbia.

References

Populated places in Kolubara District